The women's 800 metres at the 2018 European Athletics Championships takes place at the Olympic Stadium on 7, 8 and 10 August.

Records

Schedule

Results

Round 1

First 3 in each heat (Q) and the next fastest 4 (q) advanced to the Semifinals.

Semifinals

First 3 (Q) and next 2 fastest (q) qualify for the final.

Final

References

800 W
800 metres at the European Athletics Championships
Euro